The 2022–23 season of the Challenger Pro League began in August 2022 and is scheduled to end in April 2023. It is the first season under its new name after being renamed from First Division B.

Team changes

In
 Dender EH were promoted as champions of the 2021–22 Belgian National Division 1.
 Beerschot were relegated from the 2021–22 Belgian First Division A.
 RSCA Futures, Club NXT, Jong Genk and SL16 FC were added to the league as the league was expanded with four U23 teams and they finished as the top four teams in the 2021–22 Belgian U23 league.

Out
 Westerlo were promoted from  the 2021–22 Belgian First Division B as champions.
 Royal Excel Mouscron folded as a team and ceased to exist.

Name change
 Waasland-Beveren found an agreement with the owners of the rights to the former club K.S.K. Beveren, which allowed it to change its name to S.K. Beveren.

Format changes
Four U23 teams were added to the league as part of a two-season trial, expanding the league from 8 to 12 teams. These twelve teams will play each other twice in a regular competition, after which the league is split, with the top and bottom six teams playing in separate leagues, continuing with the points gained. At the top end, only the champion will be promoted as three teams will be relegated from the 2022–23 Belgian First Division A to reduce the size back from 18 to 16 teams. At the bottom end, the team finishing last will be relegated. U23 teams cannot be promoted to the Belgian First Division A, but can suffer relegation, furthermore they always have to play at least one level below their A team counterparts, hence could be relegated despite not finishing last.

Team information

Stadiums and locations

Personnel and kits

Managerial changes

Regular season

League table

Positions by round 
The table lists the positions of teams after the completion of each matchday, even if due to postponed matches this means the teams have an unequal number of games played. For instance, after completion of the final matchday, one match was still to be played, which could still change the final finishing order.

Results

Play-offs
Following the regular season, the league is split in to two halves. The top 6 teams take part in the promotion play-off, where the top team will become champions and promote to the 2023–24 Belgian Pro League, unless this team is an U23 team in which case the highest finishing non-U23 team will get promoted instead. The bottom 6 teams take part in the relegation play-off, with the bottom team relegated to the 2023–24 Belgian National Division 1. For both play-offs, all points obtained during the regular season will be kept in full at the start of the play-offs.

Promotion play-off

Relegation play-off

Season statistics

Top scorers

Number of teams by provinces

Notes

References

2022-23
2022–23 in European second tier association football leagues
2
Current association football seasons